The Adamantina Formation is a geological formation in the Bauru Basin of western São Paulo state, in southeastern Brazil.

Its strata date back to the Late Cretaceous epoch of the Cretaceous Period, during the Mesozoic Era.   The formation is part of the Bauru Group in the northeastern Paraná Basin.

Geology
Dinosaur remains are among the fossils that have been recovered from the Adamantina Formation. According to some studies, the Adamantina Formation dates from the Turonian to the Santonian stage (90-83.5 million years ago) of the late Cretaceous, other studies have found a much younger age - Campanian to Maastrichtian (83.5-66 million years ago) of the late Cretaceous.

More recent studies lean into the latter category and an unpublished article abstract revealed at the Society of Vertebrate Paleontology in 2017 also argues that the Allen Formation, Loncoche, and Los Alamitos Formation are all contemporaries and are no later than 72.1Ma in age. A zircon was found dating to 85.2 ± 2.7 Ma so this represents a maximum age.

Geological setting 
During the Early Jurassic, the supercontinent Pangea started to drift apart due to the breakup of Gondwana and Laurasia. The breakup of Gondwana caused the formation of the large Parana Basin. This basin has a size of ~1,100,000km2 and can be found not only in Brazil but also in Paraguay, Uruguay, and Argentina. The separation of the supercontinent and the breakup of Brazil and Africa was accompanied by volcanism that caused large eruptions of flood basalts. These volcanic rocks formed the Serra Geral Formation which underlies the deposits of the Bauru Group.

The Bauru Basin is a trough that, as Miall (1990) argues, evolved due to “thermo-mechanical subsidence” during the Late Cretaceous, probably due to the breakup of Africa and India. The sediments reach a thickness of up to ~300 m and consist mainly of siliciclastic sediments. The Bauru Group can be subdivided into five different formations  from bottom to top: Caiua, Santo Anastacio, Adamantina, and Uberaba. Not all formations are equally well represented in the different states and differences occur according their sedimentary composition and therefore also in their naming.

Vertebrate paleofauna

Crurotarsans

Ornithodirans 
Indeterminate dinosaur remains are known from the formation.

Lepidosaurs

Amphibians

Mammals
Eutheria incertae sedis, Brasilestes (tribosphenida incertae sedis), gondwanatheres and meridiolestidans.

See also 

 
 List of dinosaur-bearing rock formations
 
 Asencio Formation

References 

 
Geologic formations of Brazil
Cretaceous Brazil
Sandstone formations
Mudstone formations
Siltstone formations
Conglomerate formations
Coal formations
Coal in Brazil
Alluvial deposits
Fluvial deposits
Lacustrine deposits
Aeolian deposits
Cretaceous paleontological sites of South America
Paleontology in Brazil
Environment of São Paulo (state)
Landforms of São Paulo (state)